Henry McLeish formed the McLeish government on 26 October 2000 following his appointment as the First Minister of Scotland. It followed the death of Donald Dewar on 11 October 2000 during the 1st Scottish Parliament. It was a continuation of the Labour–Liberal Democrat coalition that had been formed following the first election to the Scottish Parliament in 1999.

List of ministers

October 2000 to November 2001

Changes 

 Sam Galbraith resigned from his post of Minister for Environment, Sport and Culture on 20 March 2001. Following his resignation, the environment portfolio was combined with that of rural development, planning was added to the transport portfolio, and the sport and culture portfolio was given Deputy Minister Allan Wilson without a promotion to minister. In addition, a new post of Deputy Minister for Transport and Planning in line with the expanded transport portfolio. This post was filled by Lewis Macdonald.

Changes 
Tavish Scott resigned from his post of Deputy Minister for Parliament on 9 March 2001. He was replaced by Euan Robson.

References

Scottish governments
2000 establishments in Scotland
2001 disestablishments in Scotland
Coalition governments of the United Kingdom
Ministries of Elizabeth II